The  is a river that flows from Gifu Prefecture to Toyama Prefecture in Japan. It is called Miya River (宮川 Miya-gawa) in Gifu.

Geography
The river flows from Mount Kaore in Gifu and meets the Takahara River at the border between Gifu and Toyama. Then it flows straight to the north and pours into Toyama Bay and the Sea of Japan. It once meandered through the city of Toyama, but the new waterway was constructed in the west of the city to avoid floods. Toyama City Hall and other governments are located on the reclaimed land of the old river.

Toyama Prefecture
Toyama (city)

Tributary 
 Ida River
 Kumano River
 Nagamune River
 Takahara River

Pollution
The river was polluted with cadmium due to mining and caused the itai-itai disease in the downstream towns around World War II.

Naming
The Japanese Navy cruiser  was named after this river.

External links
 (mouth)

Rivers of Toyama Prefecture
Rivers of Gifu Prefecture
Rivers of Japan